Samayada Gombe is a 1984 Indian Kannada-language drama film directed and co-produced by Dorai–Bhagavan. The film stars Rajkumar, Srinath, Roopa Devi and Menaka. It is based on the novel of same name written by Chitralekha. This is the first Kannada movie of Malayalam actress Menaka, who played the role of Rajkumar's sister and Srinath's wife in the movie. The film met with positive response upon release from critics and was declared a Blockbuster at the box office with seeing a theatrical run of at least 26 weeks. SK Bhagawan had revealed that Dr. Rajkumar's remuneration for the movie was Rs. 6 lakhs. One of the co-producers of the movie, Radhakrishna was the person who taught Sitar to Rajkumar and also happened to be the elder brother of director Dorairaj.

Plot
Young Anil accidentally injures his sister.  Fearing his father's punishment,  he runs away. He is adopted by a lorry driver and is renamed Guru. Guru now a grown up man coincidentally works as a driver to his own sister's husband. Initially both are unaware of the true relationship between them. But treat each other like own siblings.  Guru finally finds out that his owner is his own brother-in-law and sister,  remains silent as he thinks he didn't fulfill his duties that he ought to have completed to his family. Also he doesn't want to leave behind or neglect his foster family.  Later Guru reveals his identity to his real mother on her death bed. After many days, Guru's sister's family decides to return to their native place.  Even when he got one last chance to reconcile with his family,  Guru doesn't tell anything and bids them a tearful goodbye.

Cast

Soundtrack
The music of the film was composed by M. Ranga Rao with lyrics penned by Chi. Udaya Shankar.

Track list

Reception
The movie upon release won critical acclaim for the story and performances of the lead actors. 
The movie completed 50 days in all 20 first release centres. The movie ran for 175 days in Bengaluru and Mysuru and 100 days in several theatres in Uttara Karnataka.

References

External links
 

1984 films
1980s Kannada-language films
Indian drama films
Films scored by M. Ranga Rao
Films based on Indian novels
1984 drama films
Films directed by Dorai–Bhagavan